Bertha Drechsler Adamson (March 25, 1848 – May 12, 1924) was a Scottish-born Canadian violinist, educator and conductor.

The daughter of Adam Hamilton, who taught music at the University of Edinburgh, she was born Bertha Drechsler Hamilton in Edinburgh. With her sister Emily, she studied violin in Leipzig with Ferdinand David. She performed with her father's quartet, which included her sister and her brother Carl, in the United Kingdom. After she married in 1869, she moved to Hamilton, Ontario, later settling in Toronto. In 1887, she joined the teaching staff of the newly formed Toronto Conservatory of Music. In 1888, she was first violinist for the Conservatory String Quartette; she left the Conservatory later that year but returned in 1895. She was Concert Mistress in 1906/07 of the newly formed Toronto Conservatory Symphony Orchestra and was second desk of the Toronto Symphony Orchestra through 1911 at least. From 1901 to 1904, she was first violin for the Toronto Conservatory String Quartette.

Pupils of Drechsler Adamson included Harry Adaskin, Frank Edward Blachford, Julia Grover Choate and Lina Drechsler Adamson, her daughter.

She died in Toronto at the age of 76.

References 

1848 births
1924 deaths
Canadian classical violinists
Canadian conductors (music)
Canadian music educators
Musicians from Edinburgh
Musicians from Hamilton, Ontario
Academics of the University of Edinburgh
Academic staff of The Royal Conservatory of Music
Women classical violinists
Women music educators
19th-century Canadian violinists and fiddlers
20th-century Canadian violinists and fiddlers
Canadian women violinists and fiddlers